Colin Cole may refer to:
 Colin Cole (American football) (born 1980), Canadian born, American football player
 Colin Cole (officer of arms) (1922–2001), English officer of arms
 Colin Cole (cricketer) (1916–1994), English cricketer